Embrace the Darkness is a Big Finish Productions audio drama based on the long-running British science fiction television series Doctor Who.

Plot

The Eighth Doctor and Charley Pollard encounter an ancient race in the Cimmerian System, whose return could prove apocalyptic. But as the Darkness envelops the station the Doctor learns that their seemingly evil acts might be more than they appear. To save the day, the Doctor must battle an artificial intelligence as well as the Cimmerians

Cast
The Doctor — Paul McGann
Charley Pollard — India Fisher
Ferras — Lee Moone
Haliard — Mark McDonnell
Orllesnsa — Nicola Boyce
ROSM — Ian Brooker

Reception

The Discontinuity Guide like the set up, the new alien race and the story in general, but found the resolution to be low key and almost occurring off screen. Despite this, it recommended the story.

Production

Released April 2002, number 31 in the Big Finish Doctor Who Catalogue.

References

External links
 Big Finish Productions - Embrace the Darkness

2002 audio plays
Eighth Doctor audio plays
Audio plays by Nicholas Briggs